The Balta is a left tributary of the river Târnava Mică in Romania. It discharges into the Târnava Mică in Sântămărie, near Cetatea de Baltă.

References

Rivers of Romania
Rivers of Sibiu County
Rivers of Alba County